Mary Dudley (c. 1530–1535 – 9 August 1586) was a lady-in-waiting at the court of Elizabeth I and the mother of Sir Philip Sidney and Mary Sidney Herbert, Countess of Pembroke.

Mary Dudley may also refer to:
Mary (Dudley) Sutton, Countess of Home (1586–1644), British patron of the arts
Mary Dee or Mary Dudley (1912–1964), African-American radio personality
Mary Dudley (Quaker), (1750–1823) British Quaker minister